Branko Kankaraš (born 28 May 1988) is a Serbian-born Montenegrin handball player for RK Metaloplastika and the Montenegro national team.

Club career
At club level, Kankaraš played in Serbia (Jugović, Metaloplastika, and Vojvodina), Turkey (Mersin), France (Valence and Istres), Belarus (Meshkov Brest), North Macedonia (Metalurg Skopje), and Israel (Maccabi Rishon LeZion).

International career
At international level, Kankaraš represented Montenegro at two European Championships (2016 and 2020).

References

External links
 LNH record
 

1988 births
Living people
Sportspeople from Novi Sad
Serbian people of Montenegrin descent
Montenegrin people of Serbian descent
Serbian male handball players
Montenegrin male handball players
RK Jugović players
RK Metaloplastika players
RK Vojvodina players
RK Crvena zvezda players
Expatriate handball players
Montenegrin expatriate sportspeople in Turkey
Montenegrin expatriate sportspeople in France
Montenegrin expatriate sportspeople in Belarus
Montenegrin expatriate sportspeople in North Macedonia
Montenegrin expatriate sportspeople in Israel